Doña Remedios Trinidad, officially the Municipality of Doña Remedios Trinidad,  is a 1st class municipality in the province of Bulacan, Philippines. According to the 2020 census, it has a population of 28,656 people.

It is known as "Bulacan's Last Frontier" because of its natural environment and as it is the least travelled town in the province.

Etymology
The municipality of Doña Remedios Trinidad was named in honor of Doña Remedios T. Romualdez, mother of then First Lady Imelda Romualdez Marcos, who was a Bulakeña from the town of Baliuag.

History
On September 13, 1977, Philippine President Ferdinand Marcos issued Presidential Decree No. 1196 creating the municipality of Doña Remedios Trinidad.

The municipality covers seven barangays, originally part of Angat, Norzagaray, and San Miguel. These are Pulong Sampaloc and Camachile of Angat; Bayabas and Kabayunan of Norzagaray; Talbac, Camachin and Kalawakan of San Miguel.

Geography
Doña Remedios Trinidad is the largest municipality in Bulacan, occupying almost 1/3 of the total land area of the province. It lies on the southern edge of the Sierra Madre mountain range, and partially embraces three major conservation areas: the Angat Watershed Forest Reserve, Biak-na-Bato National Park, and Doña Remedios–General Tinio Watershed Forest Reserve, comprising 327.3 km2 of alienable and disposable public land.

Topography

List of highest peaks in D.R.T by elevation:

 Mount Sumag -  
 Mount Tanawan - 
 Mount Silad - 
 Mount Sumacbao - 
 Mount Palanas - 
 Mount Lumot - 
 Mount Mabio - 
 Mt. Susungdalaga - 
 Mount Silid - 
 Balistada Hill - 
 Digos hill - 
 Mount Gola - 
 Tila Pilon Hills - 
 Mount Manalmon -

Waterfalls

List of waterfalls in Dona Remedios Trinidad:

 Verdivia Falls
 Secret Falls 
 Talon ni Eva Falls 
 Talon Lucab Falls 
 Talon Pedro falls
 Talon Pari Falls
 13th Falls 
 Zamora Falls

Rivers

 Balaong River 
 Madlum River

Barangays
Doña Remedios Trinidad is politically subdivided into the following 8 barangays:

Climate

Demographics

Doña Remedios Trinidad is the least populated of all the municipalities and cities of Bulacan, with less than one percent of the province's population.

Economy 

Municipality of Doña Remedios Trinidad is a mainly agricultural town. Agricultural products, such as pineapples, are the main source of income of the town and its residents.

On December 12, 2007, the Province of Bulacan and the Metropolitan Waterworks and Sewerage System (MWSS) signed an agreement for the development of an P11-billion bulk water supply project. Ayala-owned Manila Water Co. Inc. will implement the project. MWSS and Manila Water will provide a financial package of an infrastructure grant, a P10-million development assistance and a P10-million royalty fee to the towns of Norzagaray and Doña Remedios Trinidad, which will host the water supply project.

Education 
One of the main secondary schools in DRT is the Laura De Leon Halili High School, located in Barangay Pulong Sampaloc. Most of the students in this school come from three barangays of DRT (Pulong Sampaloc, Camachile, and Bayabas) and some from the adjacent barangay of Banaban in Angat.
The San Ildefonso-based Bulacan Agricultural State College opened a branch campus as Bulacan Agricultural State College-DRT located in Barangay Sapang Bulak.

Gallery

References

External links

 [ Philippine Standard Geographic Code]
All About Doña Remedios Trinidad Bulacan
Philippine Census Information

Municipalities of Bulacan
Populated places established in 1977
Establishments by Philippine presidential decree